Narhar Vishnu Gadgil (10 January 1896 – 12 January 1966) was an Indian freedom fighter and politician from Maharashtra, India. He was also a writer. He wrote in both Marathi and English. His son Vitthalrao Gadgil represented Congress later as minister and ideologue. His grandson Anant Gadgil also went on to become a politician.

Gadgil graduated from Fergusson College in Pune in 1918, and obtained a degree in Law in 1920.

Activities before India's independence
Gadgil was born a member of the Gadgil gharana of Velneshwar-Wai.

In India's pre-independence days, freedom fighters Lokmanya Bal Gangadhar Tilak, Mahatma Gandhi, Jawaharlal Nehru, and Vallabhbhai Patel influenced Gadgil. Spiritual leaders Swami Ramkrishna Paramhans and Swami Vivekanand also made a deep impression on him. He joined the Indian National Congress in 1920, immediately after obtaining his law degree and started his active participation in the national freedom movement. He suffered imprisonment from the ruling British government eight times for the participation.

In India's pre-independence days, Gadgil served as the secretary of Poona District Congress Committee (1921–25), the president of Maharashtra Pradesh Congress Committee (1937–45), and the whip and secretary of the Congress Legislative Party (1945–47). He was elected to the central Legislative Assembly in 1934.

Gadgil was a pioneer in social reform movements in Maharashtra in the 1930s.

During the Civil Disobedience Movement, which began in 1930, Gadgil was listed as a leader for the Maharashtra Civil Disobedience Committee and the Pune War Council.

Service after India's independence
Between 1947 and 1952 Gadgil served as a minister in the first central cabinet of independent India. He held the portfolios of Public Works, and Mines and Power. In his first year in the central Cabinet, he initiated the project of building a military-caliber road from Pathankot to Srinagar via Jammu in Kashmir as a part of India's activities in the 1947 Indo-Pakistan War. As a cabinet minister, he also initiated the important development projects pertaining to Bhakra, Koyna, and Hirakund dams. He was a member of the Congress Working Committee from 1952 to 1955.

Gadgil served as the governor of Punjab from 1958 to 1962 and as the vice-chancellor of Poona University 1964 onwards until his death less than two years later.

He was associated with several public associations and institutions, including Sarvajanik Sabha, Pune; Young Men's Association, Pune; Maharashtra Youth League, Bombay; Pune Central Cooperative Bank; and Pune Municipality.

His son Vitthalrao Gadgil was a veteran congressman and MP from Pune Lok Sabha constituency, and his grandson Anant Gadgil is currently spokesman for Maharashtra Pradesh Congress Committee.

Honour
The Indian Post & Telegraph Department issued a commemorative postage stamp in Gadgil's honour in 1985.

Authorship
Gadgil wrote several books and articles on politics, economics, law, and history. He was elected president of Marathi Sahitya Sammelan in 1962 held at Satara.

The following are some of Gadgil's books:

 Pathik (autobiography)
 Rajya Shastra Wichar
 Shubha Shastra
 Waktrutwa Shastra
 Gyanbache Arthashastra
 Government from Inside
  Shikhancha Itihaas (history of Sikhs)

References

Indian independence activists from Maharashtra
Indian National Congress politicians from Maharashtra
Governors of Punjab, India
Marathi-language writers
First Nehru ministry
1896 births
1966 deaths
Politicians from Pune
Lok Sabha members from Maharashtra
India MPs 1952–1957
Members of the Central Legislative Assembly of India
Place of death missing
Marathi politicians
Presidents of the Akhil Bharatiya Marathi Sahitya Sammelan
Ministers of Power of India
Prisoners and detainees of British India